Nursahat Pazziyev is a Turkmen boxer. At the 2012 Summer Olympics, he competed in the Men's middleweight, but was defeated in the first round.

References

Year of birth missing (living people)
Living people
Olympic boxers of Turkmenistan
Boxers at the 2012 Summer Olympics
Middleweight boxers
Boxers at the 2010 Summer Youth Olympics
Turkmenistan male boxers
Boxers at the 2018 Asian Games
Asian Games competitors for Turkmenistan
21st-century Turkmenistan people